Eslamabad-e Yek (also Romanized as Eslāmābād-e Yek; also known as Eslāmābād) is a village in Poshtkuh Rural District, Falard District, Lordegan County, Chaharmahal and Bakhtiari Province, Iran. At the 2006 census, its population was 429, in 78 families.

References 

Populated places in Lordegan County